Constancia Angeline Reyes Nubla (born May 27, 1954), better known by her screen name Coney Reyes, is a Filipino actress, comedian, television host and producer.

Coney made her debut on the silver screen in the 1975 film Return of the Dragon. By that same period, she also appeared at noontime variety shows Student Canteen (1975–1982) and Eat Bulaga! (1982–1991).

Reyes has also appeared in teleseryes, had a role in Ysabella, and lead anti-heroine roles in 100 Days to Heaven, Huwag Ka Lang Mawawala, Nathaniel, and My Dear Heart. Currently, she plays Isabella Gonzales in Love of My Life.

Early years
Reyes earned a degree of Bachelor of Arts major in Communication Arts at Maryknoll College (now Miriam College). Reyes was a student leader and consistent dean's lister during her college days. She was a Baron Travel Girl of 1974 finalist before she entered Philippine Showbiz.

Career

1974–1984: Career beginnings and breakthrough with Coney Reyes on Camera
Before being exposed to acting, Coney, then a college student, served as a "TV girl" (equivalent of radio VJs) introducing shows and reading advertisements for BBC-2.

Reyes made her first film appearance in The Return of the Dragon (1974) alongside Ramon Zamora playing the lead role. Following her debut in for films, she made her maiden appearance on Student Canteen, a Philippine noontime variety show on GMA-7, on January 6, 1975, where she served as primary female co-host with Pepe Pimentel, Eddie Ilarde and Bobby Ledesma up to 1982.

Nine years following her debut in The Return of the Dragon, she starred in Bago Kumalat ang Kamandag (1983) and won Best Actress during the 1983 Metro Manila Film Festival.

After Student Canteen, Reyes then named "Coney Reyes-Mumar", got her own television series to host titled Coney Reyes-Mumar Studio (1977). The series only lasted one year. Four years later, Reyes was given another series – Coney Reyes Mumar on Set (1981), but like Coney Reyes-Mumar Studio, it only lasted one year before ending.

1982–1991: Eat... Bulaga! welcomes a new family member and breakthrough with Coney Reyes on Camera 
On March 7, 1982, Coney Reyes-Mumar was unceremoniously sacked by the management of Student Canteen for reasons not widely known. Shortly after, she was offered to be Eat... Bulaga!'s new female co-host, as Chiqui Hollman (her counterpart in the said programme) was leaving EB, only to appear at its rival show, Student Canteen.

For two months, Reyes contemplated on joining Eat... Bulaga!. In the meantime, she did a movie with Joseph Estrada, and a week-long co-hosting stint at Daigdig ng mga Misis sa Telebisyon with former SC co-host Pepe Pimentel on BBC-2's (Marcos-era iteration of ABSCBN-2).

On May 18, 1982, Coney Reyes-Mumar was heralded as the newest member of the Eat... Bulaga! family, coinciding with the DOMSAT (Domestic Satellite) launch of the programme in a television special at RPN-9. On that same television special, Eat... Bulaga!'''s now-famous theme song debuted, with Coney being mentioned in the lyrics for being the only female co-host.

Coney was warmly welcomed by the viewers of the then-number one noontime variety show, bringing with her the sympathy of the audience due to her firing at SC.

With her joining Eat... Bulaga!, Coney was opened to the avenues of show-business even more.

In 1984, Reyes starred in a lead role in Lovingly Yours: The Movie, the movie adaptation of good friend Helen Vela's Lovingly Yours, Helen, in the segment "Akin Ang Walang Diyos", a horror drama starring Julie Vega. Vega and Reyes starred in the segment one year before Vega's death in 1985.

After the cancellations of Coney Reyes-Mumar Studio and Coney Reyes Mumar on Set, Reyes was given her own anthology series called Coney Reyes on Camera, rival to Lovingly Yours, Helen on GMA-7. The series ran from 1984 to 1998 making the longest running Philippine anthology television series before Maalaala Mo Kaya broke the record in 2011. The drama was a success and won the PMPC Star Awards for Television category for Best Drama Anthology three consecutive times. Reyes portrayed different parts in the series – host, lead star, and also producer.

Despite the 'network drama anthology' rivalry of Reyes's Coney Reyes on Camera and Helen Vela's Lovingly Yours, Helen (which actually ran on Saturdays and Sundays, respectively), Reyes starred in an episode in Lovingly Yours in 1990 with Vela and with other close friends including Vilma Santos and Tina Revilla-Valencia. Returning the favour, Reyes starred again with friends Vilma and Tina for a tribute episode in 1994 to Helen, who died of cancer two years prior.

In the late 1980s, rumours spread of Coney and Eat... Bulaga! co-host Vic Sotto having a romantic relationship. By then Reyes' marriage to Larry Mumar was annulled, and Sotto having separated with his wife, Dina Bonnevie, in 1986. Vic and Coney's relationship, for a while, went public until Coney filed for a maternity leave at EB just after the programme's move from RPN-9 to ABSCBN-2 in February 1989. Reyes returned to the programme in time for its 10th Anniversary celebration in September that year, only three months after giving birth to son Vico.

In December 1991, a year after becoming a born-again Christian, Reyes left Eat... Bulaga! for good, although her name was still mentioned in the theme song until 1995.

1991–1998: Focusing on Coney Reyes on Camera
Coney, having left her daily hosting at Eat... Bulaga!, focused on her weekly drama anthology, Coney Reyes on Camera. The programme, along with other TAPE, Inc. produced shows, moved to ABS-CBN in 1989 after the sequestration of RPN-9.

By 1995, when TAPE left the network (along with Eat... Bulaga!) for GMA-7, Coney was in charge of her show with CAN Television and Productions (derived from her real name, Constancia Angeline Nubla) along with the network's production unit, and thus Coney Reyes on Camera remained in ABS-CBN.

On the later years of the programme, Coney stopped acting in the show and only did the opening and closing segments.

On December 26, 1998, Coney Reyes on Camera aired its final episode, and Coney went on a two-month hiatus.

 1999: After Coney Reyes on Camera, return to teleseryes 
Months after Coney Reyes on Camera ended, Reyes returned to television by starring in Ang Munting Paraiso (1999–2002), a weekly family drama which ran for three years, chronicling around the life of Margarita Dionisio (Reyes) – the matriarch of the Dionisio family and the best cook in the town. Reyes stars with fellow veteran actor, Ronaldo Valdez as her husband, and CJ Ramos, Sarah Christophers, and Jericho Rosales as her children, respectively.

During the run of Ang Munting Paraiso, Reyes also starred in Sa Puso Ko Iingatan Ka (2001–03) alongside Judy Ann Santos and Piolo Pascual portraying the mother of Patricia, played by Judy Ann Santos. This series would be Reyes last year in a soap opera following an almost four-year hiatus from television and also films.

In 2004, Reyes appeared in her former daily show Eat... Bulaga!'s 25th Anniversary Special held in Expo Pilipino at Clark, Pampanga. With a special number herself and with Tito, Vic, and Joey, it was their first reunion as the memorable quartet in the programme, since Coney's departure from EB more than a decade ago.

After her four-year hiatus, Reyes reunited with her Sa Puso Ko Iingatan Ka co-star Judy Ann Santos in 2007 to star in Ysabella (2007–08). This series catapulted Coney Reyes as being dubbed as the Primera Kontrabida. For her performance in Ysabella, she was nominated for Best Actress in the 22nd PMPC Star Awards for Television in 2008 for her portrayal as Victoria Amarillo. Coney Reyes's Victoria is one of the most iconic villains in Philippine television due to her attitude, schemes, and looks.

Shortly after Ysabella ended, she starred in Maalaala Mo Kaya (2009) episode Tattoo alongside Rodjun Cruz, Jim Paredes, and Maureen Mauricio, and went on to star in more episodes.

Twelve years after her reunion movie with Vic Sotto in Biyudo si Daddy, Biyuda si Mommy (1997), Reyes made her comeback to the film industry to star alongside Bea Alonzo, Derek Ramsay, and Sam Milby in And I Love You, a film revolving around three lovers.

In 2010, Reyes made another return to television in Rubi (2010), a remake of the 2004 Mexican Televisa series of the same name. The series stars Jake Cuenca, Shaina Magdayao, Diether Ocampo, and Angelica Panganiban portraying the title role of Rubi, a girl who is scheming, ambitious, and cunning who has a conscience, but chooses not to listen to it to reach her dreams at the expense of others. Reyes plays the supporting role of Elisa Ferrer – Hector's (Ocampo) overprotective mother who disapproves of Rubi in being in her son's life and becoming his wife.

After portraying several supporting roles in Sa Puso Ko Iingatan Ka, Ysabella, and Rubi, Reyes was given her first lead role since Ang Munting Paraiso. She starred in the critically acclaimed 100 Days to Heaven (2011) as Madam Anna Manalastas, a cold-hearted woman who returns to earth in her childhood form in order to correct her mistakes. Starring with her are Jodi Sta. Maria as Sophia, Anna's (Reyes) long lost daughter, and Xyriel Manabat who portrays Young Anna Manalastas. The series received five nominations and won four of the five. Reyes and Manabat were nominated for Pop Kapamilya TV Character for their portrayal of Anna Manalastas in the ASAP Pop Viewers' Choice Awards.

Two years after 100 Days to Heaven, Reyes made her return to primetime television in Judy Ann Santos's Huwag Ka Lang Mawawala (2013) in 2013. She portrays the role of Helena Diomedes, the mother-in-law of Anessa (Santos) who completely despises her.

In 2013, Reyes co-starred in Four Sisters and a Wedding (2013) as Grace Salazar. Reyes' character portrayal and lines, as well as the movie itself, has since become a part of popular Filipino culture. Four Sisters and a Wedding is Reyes's most recent film to date.

After almost 25 years with ABS-CBN, Reyes decided to transfer to ABS-CBN's rival network GMA Network upon the invitation of Redgie Acuña Magno, the executive vice-president for drama, coinciding with her 40th year in the industry.

With her transfer for GMA Network, she starred in Ang Dalawang Mrs. Real (2014) alongside Maricel Soriano, Lovi Poe, and Dingdong Dantes. Reyes portrayed the role of Sonia Real, the mother of Anthony Real (Dantes), a man who fell in love with two different women of two different ages and decides to marry them both. The series was nominated for Best Primetime Series for the PMPC Star Awards for TV 2014 and won two awards – one from Golden Screen TV Awards and one from US Intl Film Video Festival 2015.

In part as a promotion for Ang Dalawang Mrs. Real, Reyes guested on Startalk, an entertainment news television series, for an emotional reunion with former EB co-host and long-time friend, Joey de Leon.

2014–2018: Return to ABS-CBN and Future projects
After finishing her show on GMA Network, Reyes decided to return to ABS-CBN. Soon after her return to ABS-CBN, she was set to star in Nathaniel (2015), a fantasy television series focusing of faith and restoring goodness to humanity. Reyes stars alongside Marco Masa, Gerald Anderson, Isabelle Daza, and also her Rubi and 100 Days to Heaven co-star Shaina Magdayao. Reyes portrays the role of AVL, a rich businesswoman who forgets her faith in God and gets followers in becoming rich and successful.

Two years later, she was then said to star in My Dear Heart (2017) with Zanjoe Marudo, Bela Padilla, Ria Atayde, and Nayomi "Heart" Ramos as Heart De Jesus. The series revolves around Heart De Jesus, a sick kid who becomes a spirit. Reyes plays the role of Dr. Margaret Divinagracia, a rich doctor who is the biological grandmother of Heart (Ramos). After My Dear Heart ended, she guested on Magandang Buhay (2017) with her children Vico Sotto and L.A. Mumar During the episode, Reyes was given a special message from her children, Sotto and Mumar, respectively.

2018–present: Back as a Kapuso
After four years with the Kapamilya network, Reyes made a comeback in GMA Network as part of Victor Magtanggol, starring Alden Richards. In 2020, she also starred in Love of My Life, playing the role of the fierce and tough mother/mother-in-law, Isabella Gonzales. 

Reyes made a special one-day return to Eat Bulaga! during the celebration of the program's 43rd anniversary.

Personal life
A born-again Christian since October 1990, Reyes previously co-hosted with Peter Kairuz in The 700 Club Asia'' which shows on weeknights on GMA News TV (formerly QTV) at 11:00 pm. She is an active member and a discipleship group leader of Victory Christian Fellowship.

She is mother to Lawrence Anthony "L.A." Mumar and Carla Mumar (with former husband, former basketball player Lawrence "Larry" Mumar) and Pasig Mayor Vico Sotto (with ex-boyfriend Vic Sotto).

Filmography

Film

Television

Awards and nominations

References

External links and sources

The 700 Club
Eat Bulaga!
Ysabella

1954 births
Living people
Filipino film actresses
Filipino television actresses
Filipino television personalities
Filipino television evangelists
Filipino Christians
Filipino evangelicals
Tagalog people
20th-century Filipino actresses
21st-century Filipino actresses
Miriam College alumni
GMA Network personalities
ABS-CBN personalities